The PH postcode area, also known as the Perth postcode area, is a group of 43 postcode districts for post towns: Aberfeldy, Acharacle, Arisaig, Auchterarder, Aviemore, Ballachulish, Blairgowrie, Boat of Garten, Carrbridge, Corrour, Crieff, Dalwhinnie, Dunkeld, Fort Augustus, Fort William, Glenfinnan, Grantown-on-Spey, Invergarry, Isle of Canna, Isle of Eigg, Isle of Rum, Kingussie, Kinlochleven, Lochailort, Mallaig, Nethy Bridge, Newtonmore, Perth, Pitlochry, Roy Bridge and Spean Bridge in Scotland.

Coverage
The approximate coverage of the postcode districts:

|-
! PH1
| PERTH
|City centre north and west of the Post Office, and immediate hinterland villages
| Perth and Kinross
|-
! PH2
| PERTH
|City centre south and east of the Post Office, and immediate hinterland villages
| Perth and Kinross
|-
! PH3
| AUCHTERARDER
| Aberuthven
| Perth and Kinross
|-
! PH4
| AUCHTERARDER
| Blackford
| Perth and Kinross
|-
! PH5
| CRIEFF
| Muthill
| Perth and Kinross
|-
! PH6
| CRIEFF
| Comrie, St Fillans, Dunira
| Perth and Kinross
|-
! PH7
| CRIEFF
| Crieff, Gilmerton, Madderty
| Perth and Kinross
|-
! PH8
| DUNKELD
| Dunkeld, Birnam, Amulree
| Perth and Kinross
|-
! PH9
| PITLOCHRY
| Ballinuig, Strathy, Tulliemet
| Perth and Kinross
|-
! PH10
| BLAIRGOWRIE
| Blairgowrie and Rattray, Rattray, Bridge of Cally
| Perth and Kinross
|-
! PH11
| BLAIRGOWRIE
| Alyth
| Perth and Kinross
|-
! PH12
| BLAIRGOWRIE
| Meigle, Newtyle
| Perth and Kinross, Angus
|-
! PH13
| BLAIRGOWRIE
| Coupar Angus,
| Perth and Kinross
|-
! PH14
| PERTH
| Inchture, Abernyte
| Perth and Kinross
|-
! PH15
| ABERFELDY
| Aberfeldy
| Perth and Kinross
|-
! PH16
| PITLOCHRY
|  Pitlochry, Strath Tummel, Kinloch Rannoch
| Perth and Kinross
|-
! PH17
| PITLOCHRY
| Rannoch, Bridge of Gaur
| Perth and Kinross
|-
! PH18
| PITLOCHRY
| Blair Atholl, Calvine, Bridge of Tilt
| Perth and Kinross
|-
! PH19
| DALWHINNIE
| Dalwhinnie
| Highland
|-
! PH20
| NEWTONMORE
| Newtonmore, Kinloch Laggan, Laggan
| Highland
|-
! PH21
| KINGUSSIE
| Kingussie, Insh, Kincraig
| Highland
|-
! PH22
| AVIEMORE
| Aviemore
| Highland
|-
! PH23
| CARRBRIDGE
| Carrbridge, Bogroy
| Highland
|-
! PH24
| BOAT OF GARTEN
| Boat of Garten
| Highland
|-
! PH25
| NETHY BRIDGE
| Nethy Bridge
| Highland
|-
! PH26
| GRANTOWN-ON-SPEY
| Grantown-on-Spey, Advie, Cromdale, Dulnain Bridge
| Highland
|-
! PH30
| CORROUR
| Corrour
| Highland
|-
! PH31
| ROY BRIDGE
| Roy Bridge, Murlaggan, Tulloch
| Highland
|-
! PH32
| FORT AUGUSTUS
| Fort Augustus, Auchterawe
| Highland
|-
! PH33
| FORT WILLIAM
| Fort William
| Highland
|-
! PH34
| SPEAN BRIDGE
| Spean Bridge, South Laggan, Achnacarry
| Highland
|-
! PH35
| INVERGARRY
| Invergarry
| Highland
|-
! PH36
| ACHARACLE
| Acharacle
| Highland
|-
! PH37
| GLENFINNAN
| Glenfinnan, Polloch
| Highland
|-
! PH38
| LOCHAILORT
| Lochailort, Glenuig, Kinlochmoidart
| Highland
|-
! PH39
| ARISAIG
| Arisaig
| Highland
|-
! PH40
| MALLAIG
| Morar
| Highland
|-
! PH41
| MALLAIG
| Mallaig, Knoydart
| Highland
|-
! PH42
| ISLE OF EIGG
| Isle of Eigg
| Highland
|-
! PH43
| ISLE OF RUM
| Isle of Rum
| Highland
|-
! PH44
| ISLE OF CANNA
| Isle of Canna
| Highland
|-
! PH49
| BALLACHULISH
| Ballachulish
| Highland
|-
! PH50
| KINLOCHLEVEN
| Kinlochleven
| Highland
|}

Ballachulish and Kinlochleven were originally in the PA area as PA39 and PA40 respectively, before being transferred to the PH area in 1999.

Map

See also
Postcode Address File
 List of postcode areas in the United Kingdom
 Centre points of the United Kingdom
 Extreme points of the United Kingdom

References

External links
Royal Mail's Postcode Address File
A quick introduction to Royal Mail's Postcode Address File (PAF)

Perth, Scotland
Postcode areas covering Scotland